The 1924 Yale Bulldogs football team represented Yale University in the 1924 college football season. The Bulldogs opened the season with victories over North Carolina and Georgia and concluded the season with victories over rivals Princeton and Yale.  The team finished with an undefeated 6–0–2 record under seventh-year head coach Tad Jones.  The two ties were against Dartmouth and Army.

Yale end Richard Luman was named a consensus selection for the 1924 College Football All-America Team, having been so honored by the All-America Board and the International News Service.  Other Yale players receiving first-team All-American honors in 1924 were center Winslow Lovejoy (All-America Board, Football World, All-Sports Magazine, and Norman E. Brown), halfback Ducky Pond (Newspaper Editors Association and Billy Evans), and tackle Johnny Joss (Lawrence Perry).

Schedule

References

Yale
Yale Bulldogs football seasons
College football undefeated seasons
Yale Bulldogs football